Lloyd House is the headquarters and since 2017 Central station of the West Midlands Police, the territorial police force responsible for policing the West Midlands metropolitan county in the United Kingdom. The building also houses the office of the West Midlands Police and Crime Commissioner.

The building sits on Snow Hill Queensway, at the junction with Colmore Circus Queensway and Weaman Street, in Birmingham city centre.

History 
Lloyd House was originally constructed between 1960 and 1964 in Birmingham, England, for steel stockholder firm, Stewarts and Lloyds Ltd. The architects were Kelly and Surman. The 13-storey building has roof height of 48.7 metres. Its L-shaped floorplan is 70×30m on its largest sides.

The creation of West Midlands Police in 1974 created the need for a large headquarters within Birmingham city center. It was agreed in 1974 that the force would rent the building out for usage as its headquarters

On 4 June 2020 Lloyd House was the target of Black Lives Matter protests following the murder of George Floyd in the United States. The protests were peaceful and there were no arrest or reports of disorder.

Refurbishment 
In 2014 the need arose to refurbish Lloyd House both internally and externally. The work began on 8 September 2014 and lasted until late 2016.

References 

West Midlands Police
Buildings and structures in Birmingham, West Midlands
1960s architecture
Police stations in the West Midlands (county)
Buildings and structures completed in 1964